is a Shinto shrine in Iwamizawa, Hokkaidō, Japan. Founded in the Meiji period, it is modelled on the shinmei-zukuri style.

See also
 State Shinto
 List of Shinto shrines in Hokkaidō

References

Shinto shrines in Hokkaido